Tomas Almino Bastos Silva (born 30 April 1992), known as Tomas Bastos, is a Brazilian professional footballer who plays as an attacking midfielder for Operário Ferroviário.

Career
Bastos' contract with J. Malucelli expires in 2020.

Honours
Botafogo
 Campeonato Brasileiro Série B: 2015

References

External links 
 

1992 births
Living people
Sportspeople from Tocantins
Brazilian footballers
Brazilian expatriate footballers
Campeonato Brasileiro Série A players
Campeonato Brasileiro Série B players
Campeonato Brasileiro Série C players
UAE First Division League players
J. Malucelli Futebol players
Boa Esporte Clube players
Botafogo de Futebol e Regatas players
Coritiba Foot Ball Club players
Al Hamriyah Club players
Paysandu Sport Club players
Operário Ferroviário Esporte Clube players
Expatriate footballers in the United Arab Emirates
Brazilian expatriate sportspeople in the United Arab Emirates
Association football midfielders